Jannes Albert Munneke (born 6 February 1949) is a retired Dutch rower. He competed at the 1972 Summer Olympics in the eight event and finished in ninth place. His wife Ingrid Munneke-Dusseldorp is also an Olympic rower.

References

1949 births
Living people
Dutch male rowers
Olympic rowers of the Netherlands
Rowers at the 1972 Summer Olympics
People from Stadskanaal
Sportspeople from Groningen (province)